The Humboldt Mountains or Humboldt Range are one of the many ranges which make up the Southern Alps / Kā Tiritiri o te Moana in the South Island of New Zealand. They lie to the northwest of Lake Wakatipu in the Otago Region.  Parts of the range lie within Fiordland National Park, and they form the southern extremity of Mount Aspiring National Park. The range was named by early explorer James McKerrow, and like many geographic features worldwide, it was named in honour of notable scientist Alexander von Humboldt.

They are separated from the Ailsa Range to the south by the smaller valley of the Caples River. In the extreme southeast, the range drops straight to the waters of Lake Wakatipu, close to the small settlements of Kinloch and Glenorchy. Numerous small rivers have their sources within the Humboldts, notably the Routeburn River and the Olivine River. Two major tramping tracks follow valleys within the Humboldt Range, the Caples Track and the Routeburn Track.

References

Mount Aspiring National Park
Mountain ranges of Fiordland
Mountain ranges of Otago
Southern Alps